Boštjan Kavaš (born 13 September 1978) is a professional handball player currently playing for Wisła Płock.

Career
Kavaš has played for several clubs in the course of his career: Bakovci (1992–1996), RK Gorenje (1996–2000), RK Prevent (2000–03), RK Trimo Trebnje (2003–05), RK Gorenje (2005–2010 ), and Wisła Płock (since 2010).

References

External links
 Player profile  from the European Handball Federation

1978 births
Living people
People from Murska Sobota
Slovenian male handball players